Thomas Gleane may refer to:

Thomas Gleane of the Gleane baronets
Thomas Gleane (MP), MP for Norwich (UK Parliament constituency)